Bob Ligashesky (born June 2, 1962) is an American football coach.  He is the special teams coordinator at Syracuse University.  Ligashesky has been as assistant coach with several teams in the National Football League (NFL).

Playing career
Ligashesky was a linebacker for the Sto-Rox High School Vikings.  He was a three-year letter winner as a defensive back at the Indiana University of Pennsylvania (IUP). He graduated from IUP in 1985.

Coaching career
Ligashesky has coached for the Jacksonville Jaguars (2004) and the St. Louis Rams (2005–2006) of the National Football League (NFL). Ligashesky was hired on January 29, 2007, as the Pittsburgh Steelers special teams coach after Kevin Spencer left to coach for the Arizona Cardinals. He was hired when Mike Tomlin became head coach after Bill Cowher resigned early in 2007. He was released by the Steelers on January 7, 2010.

From 2013 to 2015, he worked as the special teams coordinator for the Houston Texans. He was released in January 2016 after a devastating loss to the Kansas City Chiefs in the AFC Wild-Card playoff game.

As a college football coach, Ligashesky has coached at the University of Pittsburgh, Bowling Green State University and Kent State University. Ligashesky was also a graduate assistant at  Arizona State University and Wake Forest University.

On March 17, 2016, he was hired as the special teams coordinator and tight end coach at the University of Illinois at Urbana–Champaign.

Following the staff's dismissal at Illinois, Ligashesky was hired by Scot Loeffler to be the special teams coordinator at Bowling Green in March 2021.

Ligashesky was hired as Syracuse's Special teams coordinator on December 9, 2021.

References

External links
 Illinois profile
 Pittsburgh Steelers profile

1962 births
Living people
American football defensive backs
Arizona State Sun Devils football coaches
Bowling Green Falcons football coaches
Houston Texans coaches
Illinois Fighting Illini football coaches
IUP Crimson Hawks football players
Jacksonville Jaguars coaches
Kent State Golden Flashes football coaches
Pittsburgh Panthers football coaches
St. Louis Rams coaches
Syracuse Orange football coaches
Wake Forest Demon Deacons football coaches
Pittsburgh Steelers coaches
People from McKees Rocks, Pennsylvania
Players of American football from Pennsylvania